Gagnoa Airport  is an airport serving Gagnoa, Côte d'Ivoire.

See also
Transport in Côte d'Ivoire

References

 OurAirports - Gagnoa
 Great Circle Mapper - Gagnoa
 Google Earth

Airports in Ivory Coast
Gagnoa
Buildings and structures in Gôh-Djiboua District